Windsong International Records was an independent record label in the United Kingdom active in the early 1990s. It specialised in releasing recordings made for or by BBC Radio One for broadcast on the In Concert radio programme.

BBC Radio 1 Live in Concert is a series of albums licensed to Windsong International.

BBC Radio 1 Live in Concert series 
WINCD001 – Family
WINCD002 – The Sensational Alex Harvey Band
WINCD003 – Caravan
WINCD004 – Wishbone Ash – Paris Theatre, 25 May 1972
WINCD005 – Nazareth
WINCD006 – Echo & the Bunnymen – Empire Theatre, Liverpool 11 January 1988
WINCD007 – Hawkwind – Paris Theatre, 28 September 1972
WINCD008 – The Skids
WINCD009 – The Ruts, Penetration – Paris Theatre, 7 July 1979
WINCD010 – Q-Tips
WINCD011 – New Order
WINCD012 – John Martyn
WINCD013 – Robin Trower
WINCD014 – Steve Hillage
WINCD015 – Racing Cars
WINCD016 – UFO
WINCD017 – Pat Travers
WINCD018 – Kevin Ayers
WINCD019 – Stackridge
WINCD020 – Steve Earle – 29 November 1988
WINCD021 – John Miles
WINCD022 – The Screaming Blue Messiahs
WINCD023 – Fields of the Nephilim
WINCD024 – Thin Lizzy – Reading Festival, 28 August 1983
WINCD025 – Paice Ashton Lord
WINCD026 – XTC – 22 December 1980
WINCD027 – Amon Düül 2 – 1973
WINCD028 – Ultravox
WINCD029 – The Incredible String Band
WINCD030 – The Selecter / The Specials – Paris Theatre, 5 December 1979
WINCD031 – Soft Machine – 1971
WINCD032 – Tyrannosaurus Rex – 1970
WINCD033 – Ashton-Lord
WINCD034 – Richard Thompson
WINCD035 – The Mission – No Snow, No Show (For The Eskimo)
WINCD036 – Vibrators / The Boys
WINCD037 – Stiff Little Fingers – Paris Theatre, 8 April 1981
WINCD038 – The Fall – Rock City, Nottingham, 25 May 1987
WINCD039 – Bert Jansch
WINCD040 – Magazine
WINCD041 – The Albion Country Band
WINCD042 – Atomic Rooster
WINCD043 – Michael Schenker Group
WINCD044 – All About Eve
WINCD045 – Deke Leonard's Iceberg / Man
WINCD046 – Clint Eastwood & General Saint
WINCD047 – Dexys Midnight Runners – 6 June 1982
WINCD048 – Lone Justice – Town & Country Club, 11 June 1986
WINCD049 – Sham 69
WINCD050 – Rick Wakeman
WINCD051 – New Model Army
WINCD052 – Curtis Mayfield – Town & Country Club, 1990
WINCD053 – Icicle Works
WINCD054 – Frankie Miller
WINCD055 – Spear of Destiny
WINCD056 – Soft Machine – 1972
WINCD057 – Ruby Turner – Glastonbury Festival, 1986
WINCD058 – The Long Ryders – Mayfair Club, Newcastle, 3 June 1987; Chester Rendezvous Club, Chester, 15 October 1985 
WINCD059 – Lone Star
WINCD060 – The Bothy Band
WINCD061 – Streetwalkers
WINCD062 – Eddie and the Hot Rods
WINCD063 – Matching Mole
WINCD064 – The Groundhogs
WINCD065 – Be-Bop Deluxe
WINCD066 – Gentle Giant
WINCD067 – Argent
WINCD068 – Killing Joke – Paris Theatre, 6 March 1985 & Reading Festival, 22 August 1986
WINCD069 – Strawbs
WINCD070 – Jethro Tull
WINCD071 – Gay and Terry Woods
WINCD072 – Dire Straits
WINCD073 – Steve Harley
WINCD074 – The Wonder Stuff
WINCD075 – Big Country
WINCD076 – Jack Bruce
WINCD077 – Judie Tzuke
WINCD078 – Hunter Ronson Band
WINCD079 – Colin Blunstone
WINCD080 – The Only Ones
WINCD081 – Chris Farlowe
WINCD082 – The Blues Band
WINCD083 – Graham Parker
WINCD084 – Mott the Hoople

References

External links
 BBC Radio 1
 BBC Radio 1 In Concert catalogue

British independent record labels
BBC Radio recordings